Reuben or Reuven is a Biblical male first name from Hebrew רְאוּבֵן (Re'uven), meaning "behold, a son". In the Bible, Reuben was the firstborn son of Jacob.

Variants include Rúben in European Portuguese; Rubens in Brazilian Portuguese; Rubén in Spanish; Rubèn in Catalan; Ruben in Dutch, German, French, Italian, Swedish, Norwegian, Danish, and Armenian; and Rupen/Roupen in Western Armenian.

The form Ruben can also be a form of the name Robin, itself a variation of the Germanic name Robert in several Celtic languages. It preserves the "u" sound from the name's first component "hruod" (compare Ruairí, the Irish form of Roderick).

Mononym 
 Ruben I, Prince of Armenia (1025/1035 – 1095), the first lord of Armenian Cilicia or "Lord of the Mountains" from 1080/1081/1082 to 1095, founder of Rubenid dynasty
 Ruben II, Prince of Armenia (c. 1165 – 1170), the seventh lord of Armenian Cilicia or "Lord of the Mountains" from 1169 to 1170
 Ruben III, Prince of Armenia (1145–1187), the ninth lord of Armenian Cilicia or "Lord of the Mountains" from 1175 to 1187
 Ruben (singer) (born 1995), full name Ruben Markussen, Norwegian singer-songwriter known by the mononym Ruben

Given name

Reuben
 Reuben Agboola (born 1962), Nigerian football player
 Reuben Bennett (1913–1989), Scottish football player and coach
 Reuben Mattus (born 1912), Polish businessman
 Reuben Fenton (1819–1885), American merchant and politician from New York
 Reuben Fine (1914–1993), American chess player and psychologist
 Reuben Foster (born 1994), American football player
 Reuben Hazell (born 1979), English football player
 Reuben James (c. 1776 – 1838), US Navy boatswain's mate
 Reuben Mednikoff (1906–1972), British surrealist artist
 Reuben Noble-Lazarus (born 1993), English football player
 Reuben Partridge (1823-1900), American pioneer bridge builder
 Reuben Reid (born 1988), English football player
 Reuben Snake (1937–1993), Ho-Chunk (Winnebago) activist, educator, spiritual leader, and tribal leader
 Reuben Sturman (1924–1997), American pornographer and businessman from Ohio
 Reuben Thorne (born 1975), New Zealand rugby player
 Reuben Wu (born 1975), English photographer, director, music producer, member of the band Ladytron
 Reuben Gray (born 2000), English singer and songwriter

Reuven
 Reuven Atar (born 1969), Israeli football player
 Reuven Feuerstein (1921–2014), Israeli psychologist
 Reuven Rivlin (born 1939), Israeli president
 Reuven Snir (born 1953), Israeli professor at the University of Haifa

Ruben
 Ruben Auervaara (1906–1964), Finnish thief and fraudster
 Ruben de Almeida Barbeiro (born 1987), real name of Portuguese electro house music DJ and producer KURA
 Ruben Cain, birth name of Robert Gibson (wrestler) (born 1958),  wrestler
 Ruben Östlund (born 1974), Swedish film director, producer and screenplay writer
 Ruben Darbinyan (1883–1968), Armenian politician and activist and government minister during the First Republic of Armenia 
 Ruben Enaje, Filipino carpenter and sign painter, known for being voluntarily crucified annually on Good Friday
 Ruben Gabrielsen (born 1992), Norwegian football player
 Ruben Kihuen (born 1980), American politician
 Ruben Trumpelmann (born 1998), South African born Namibian cricketer
 Ruben Gallego (born 1979), American politician
 Ruben Houkes (born 1979), Dutch judoka
 Ruben Kun (1942–2014), President of Nauru (1996–1997)
 Ruben Lagus (1896–1959), Finnish general, one of the principal commanders of Lapland War
 Ruben Loftus-Cheek (born 1996), English football player
 Ruben Nirvi (1905–1986), Finnish linguist and professor
 Ruben Rausing (1895–1983), founder of the food packaging company Tetra Pak
 Ruben Sevak, or Rupen Sevag, real name Ruben Çilingiryan (1886–1915), Ottoman Armenian poet, prose-writer, and doctor, killed by Turkish authorities during the Armenian Genocide
 Ruben Studdard (born 1978), American singer, winner of American Idol season 2
 Ruben Wiki (born 1973), New Zealand rugby player
 Ruben (film editor) (born 1986), Indian film editor
 Ruben van Schalm (Dutch Photographer) (born 1988), Dutch Photographer
 Ruben Vargas (born 1998), Swiss football player
 Ruben Fleischer (born 1974), American film director and producer

Rubén
 Rubén Aguiar (born 1956), Argentine long-distance runner
 Rubén Albarrán (born 1967), Mexican singer-songwriter, member of Café Tacuba
 Rubén Alonso Rosales (1925–2000), Salvadorian politician
 Rubén Amaro Jr. (born 1965), American baseball player, manager, and coach
 Rubén Baraja (born 1975), Spanish football manager
 Rubén Sobrino (born 1992), Spanish football player
 Rubén Bareiro Saguier (1930–2014), Paraguayan poet and writer
 Rubén Blades (born 1948), Panamanian salsa singer, songwriter, actor, Latin jazz musician and activist
 Rubén Castro (born 1981), Spanish football player
 Rúben Dias (born 1997), Portuguese football player
 Rubén Espinoza (born 1961), Chilean football player
 Rubén Limardo (born 1985), Venezuelan fencer
 Rubén Iván Martínez (born 1984), Spanish football player
 Rubén Maza (born 1967), Venezuelan long-distance runner
 Rúben Neves (born 1997), Portuguese football player
 Rubén Duarte (born 1995), Spanish football player
 Rubén Rangel (born 1977), Venezuelan road racing cyclist
 Rubén de la Red (born 1985), Spanish football manager
 Rubén Yáñez (born 1993), Spanish football player
 Rúben Amorim (born 1985), Portuguese football manager
 Rúben Semedo (born 1994), Portuguese football player
 Rúben Vinagre (born 1999), Portuguese football player

Rueben
 Rueben Mayes, Canadian former American football player

Rube
 Rube Goldberg (Reuben) (1883–1970), American cartoonist and creator of Rube Goldberg devices

Rupen
 Rupen of Montfort (died 1313), Cypriot nobleman
 Rupen Zartarian (1874–1915), Ottoman Armenian writer, educator, and political activist, killed by Turkish authorities during the Armenian Genocide

Roupen
Roupen Altiparmakian, Armenian violin and oud player

Surname

Reuben
 David Reuben (born 1933), American author and psychiatrist
 David and Simon Reuben, billionaire entrepreneurs in the UK
 Gloria Reuben (born 1964), Canadian-American actress
 John Reuben (born John Reuben Zappin in 1979), American Christian hip-hop artist
 Julie Reuben (born 1960), historian interested in the role of education in American society and culture
 Scott Reuben (born 1958), disgraced American anesthesiologist and professor
 Stewart Reuben (born 1939), British chess player, chess arbiter, and poker author
 William A. Reuben (1915 or 1916 – 2004), American journalist noted for his work on the cases of Julius and Ethel Rosenberg and of Alger Hiss

Ruben
 Alessandro Ruben (born 1960), Italian politician
 Karl Ruben, Danish chess master
 Sam Ruben (1913–1943), American biochemist known for his work on carbon fixation in photosynthesis and discovery of carbon-14, born Charles Rubenstein
 Samuel Ruben (1900–1988), American inventor and founder of Duracell
 Livingston Antony Ruben, Indian film editor who works in the Tamil film industry

Rueben
 Hannah Rueben (born 1994), Nigerian wrestler

Fictional characters 
 Reuben (Lilo & Stitch), also known as Experiment 625, a character in the Lilo & Stitch franchise
 Reuben (Final Fantasy), a character from Final Fantasy Mystic Quest
 Reuben, a Minecraft pig from Minecraft: Story Mode
 Reuben Kincaid, the Partridge Family's manager
 Ruben Lozano, a crime lord antagonist in Red vs. Blue Season 14
 Ruben "Ruvik" Victoriano, main antagonist (The Evil Within)

Food
 Reuben sandwich, a hot sandwich made with corned beef

Places
 Rupen River, a river in Gujarat in western India
 Rupen River (Gir), a river in Gujarat in western India
 Reubens, Idaho a city in Lewis County, Idaho, United States

See also 
 Rube
 Reubens (disambiguation)
 Rubens (disambiguation)
 Rubin (disambiguation)

References

English masculine given names
Hebrew masculine given names